Drwalew  is a village in the administrative district of Gmina Chynów, within Grójec, Warszawa Voivodeship, in central Poland.

References

Villages in Poddębice County